Volume Up may refer to:

Volume Up (radio show)
Volume Up, album by Maine band Rustic Overtones 1999
Volume Up (EP), by Korean band 4Minute
"Volume Up", song by 4Minute from Volume Up (EP)